USNK is a Hungarian music duo from Romania consisting of Kund Filep and Nimród Laskay. Together they won the eighth season of the Hungarian version of the X Factor. They competed in A Dal 2019, the 2019 edition of the Hungarian national selection for the Eurovision Song Contest, with the song "Posztolj!". They reached the semi-finals before being eliminated.

References

External links

The X Factor winners